Tripterygium regelii, or Regel's threewingnut (Pinyin: Dongbei Leigongteng), is a rambling, shrubby perennial deciduous yellow vine native to Korea, Japan and Manchuria. Fruits are greenish white, 3-angled, and winged.

"Tripterygium wilfordii Hook.f., known as Leigongteng (Thunder God Vine) in traditional Chinese medicine, has attracted much attention for its applications in relieving autoimmune disorders such as rheumatoid arthritis and systemic lupus erythematosus, and for treating cancer. Molecular analyses of the ITS and 5S rDNA sequences indicate that T. hypoglaucum and T. doianum are not distinct from T. wilfordii, while T. regelii should be recognized as a separate species. The results also demonstrate potential value of rDNA sequence data in forensic detection of adulterants derived from Celastrus angulatus in commercial samples of Leigongteng."

Certain extracts from Tripterygium wilfordii, as well as from Tripterygium hypoglaucum (now considered identical to T. regelii) and Tripterygium regelii, were discovered in the 1980s to have temporary antifertility effects, which has led to research on its potential as a contraceptive.

Tripterygium regelii is listed as a poisonous plant in the U.S. Food and Drug Administration Poisonous Plant Database.

Footnotes

References
  Downloadable PDF - "Molecular analyses of the Chinese herb Leigongteng (Tripterygium wilfordii Hook.f.)" (2010). Sue Ka-Yee Law et al. Phytochemistry 72 (2011) 21–26, Elsevier.

External links
 BackyardGardener.com
 Plant Supplies
 List of articles examining medicinal properties of T. regelii.

Celastraceae
Medicinal plants